Oristano Cathedral (Cattedrale di Santa Maria Assunta), dedicated to the Assumption of the Virgin Mary, is the Roman Catholic cathedral of Oristano, Sardinia, Italy. It is the seat of the Archbishop of Oristano. It is built in the Baroque style, and is located in the historical centre of the city. It was initially constructed in 1195.

References

12th-century Roman Catholic church buildings in Italy
Cathedral
Churches in the province of Oristano
Roman Catholic cathedrals in Italy
Baroque architecture in Sardinia
Cathedrals in Sardinia
Churches completed in 1195